The Purdue Boilermakers football program is a college football team that represents Purdue University in the Big Ten Conference in the National Collegiate Athletic Association. The team has had 37 head coaches and 3 interim coaches since it started playing organized football in 1887 and has been known by the nickname Boilermakers since 1891. Purdue is an original member of the Big Ten, joining in 1896 after spending six years in the Indiana Intercollegiate Athletic Association. The Boilermakers have played in 1,260 games during their 134 seasons. Six coaches have led the Boilermakers to postseason bowl games: Jack Mollenkopf, Jim Young, Leon Burtnett, Joe Tiller, Danny Hope, and Jeff Brohm. Nine coaches have won conference championships with the Boilermakers: Snake Ames and D. M. Balliet in the Indiana Intercollegiate Athletic Association, and A. G. Scanlon, James Phelan, Noble Kizer, Elmer Burnham, Stu Holcomb, Mollenkopf and Tiller in the Big Ten. No Purdue coach has led the Boilermakers to a national championship. As of the end of the 2021 season, Tiller is the all-time leader in games coached (149) and wins (87), while Mollenkopf is the all-time leader years coached (14). Ames leads the Boilermakers in winning percentage with a perfect 1.000 in his two seasons at Purdue. Among coaches with more than two seasons of tenure, Kizer has the highest winning percentage, .750, and Darrell Hazell has the lowest winning percentage, with a record of 9–33 (.214) in three and half seasons.

Of the 37 Boilermakers coaches, five have been inducted into the College Football Hall of Fame: Andy Smith, William Henry Dietz, Phelan, Mollenkopf and Young. None have received National Coach of the Year honors. On December 13, 2022, Purdue hired Ryan Walters to become the new head coach.

Key

Coaches
Statistics correct as of the end of the 2022 NCAA Division I FBS football season

Notes

References
General

Specific

Lists of college football head coaches

Indiana sports-related lists